Sŏp'ungsan station is a railway station in P'ungsal-li, Musan county, North Hamgyŏng province, North Korea, on the Musan Line of the Korean State Railway.

It was opened, along with the rest of the Sinch'am–Musan section of the Musan line, on 15 November 1929.

Local passenger trains running between Musan and Ch'ŏngjin on the southern junction of the Hambuk and P'yŏngra lines serve this station, and there are several daily commuter trains for workers and students between Musan and Komusan.

References

Railway stations in North Korea